James Leo Garrett Jr. (November 25, 1925 – February 5, 2020) was an American theologian. He held the position of Distinguished Professor Emeritus of Theology at Southwestern Baptist Theological Seminary in Fort Worth, Texas.

Personal
Garrett was born in Waco, Texas to James Leo Garrett Sr., a business teacher at Baylor University and his wife, Grace Hasseltine Jenkins Garrett. He was converted in 1935 and was baptized into membership at the Seventh and James Baptist Church in Waco. He was licensed and ordained to the gospel ministry by the First Baptist Church of Waco

He earned a Bachelor of Arts in English from Baylor University in 1945, a Bachelor of Divinity from Southwestern Baptist Theological Seminary in 1948, a Masters of Theology from Princeton Theological Seminary in 1949, a Doctor of Theology from Southwestern Baptist Theological Seminary in 1954, and a Doctor of Philosophy from Harvard University in 1966. He has done additional studies at the Catholic University of America, in Washington D.C., Oxford University, St. John's University, and Trinity Evangelical Divinity School in Deerfield, Illinois.

He died in February 2020 at the age of 94.

Career
In his long academic career he has taught at Southwestern Baptist Seminary (1949–1959, 1979–), Southern Baptist Theological Seminary in Louisville, Kentucky (1959–1973) and Baylor University in Waco, Texas (1973–1979). He has also been a visiting professor at the Hong Kong Baptist Theological Seminary. He has also been a guest lecturer in the countries of Mexico, Brazil, Uruguay, Colombia, the Ukraine, and Romania, and at several schools in the United States. 

While a student at Southwestern, he pastored three small Baptist churches, and has served as an interim pastor for several Baptist churches. He has authored several volumes, including Baptist Church Discipline in 1962, Baptists and Roman Catholicism published in 1965 by Broadman Press and We Baptists in 1999. He is best known for his two volume Systematic Theology: Biblical, Historical, and Evangelical. He has contributed articles to twenty-one other books and authored hundreds of journal articles, encyclopedia articles, and book reviews.

Sources
 Basden, Paul A. "James Leo Garrett" in Baptist Theology and Theologians (Nashville: Broadman & Holman, 2001)

Selected Readings

References

1925 births
2020 deaths
People from Waco, Texas
American Baptist theologians
Baptists from Texas
Baylor University alumni
Catholic University of America alumni
Harvard University alumni
Princeton Theological Seminary alumni
Southwestern Baptist Theological Seminary alumni
Southwestern Baptist Theological Seminary faculty
Systematic theologians